Abdel Hamid Slimani (born 19 February 1956) is a Moroccan judoka. He competed in the men's extra-lightweight event at the 1984 Summer Olympics.

References

1956 births
Living people
Moroccan male judoka
Olympic judoka of Morocco
Judoka at the 1984 Summer Olympics
Place of birth missing (living people)
20th-century Moroccan people